John Thomas Chew Hopkins (March 20, 1843 – September 19, 1922) was an American politician and lawyer from Maryland. He served as a member of the Maryland House of Delegates, representing Harford County in 1870.

Early life
John Thomas Chew Hopkins was born March 20, 1843, to Priscilla (née Worthington) and Thomas Chew Hopkins. He graduated from St. John's College in Annapolis, Maryland. He read law under Stevenson Archer and was admitted to the bar in 1865.

Career
Hopkins was a Democrat. He served as a member of the Maryland House of Delegates, representing Harford County in 1870. He served as the state's attorney of Harford County from 1871 to 1879.

Hopkins was one of the founders and the first president of the Second National Bank of Bel Air. He served as deputy collector at the Port of Baltimore during President Grover Cleveland's second administration.

Hopkins practiced law in Bel Air.

Personal life
Hopkins married Amande E. Wylie of South Carolina on April 30, 1879, at Poplar Grove in Bel Air. They had five daughters and three sons, Mrs. Clifford Dawson Rosan, Mrs. J. Stephenson Hopkins, Mary Alden, J. Thomas C. Jr., W. Wylie, W. Worthington, Ellen H. and Theresa M. His wife died in 1916.

Hopkins died on September 19, 1922, at the age of 79, at his home in Bel Air. He was buried at Darlington Cemetery.

References

1843 births
1922 deaths
People from Bel Air, Maryland
St. John's College (Annapolis/Santa Fe) alumni
Democratic Party members of the Maryland House of Delegates
Maryland lawyers
State's attorneys in Maryland
American bank presidents
19th-century American lawyers
20th-century American lawyers
19th-century American politicians
20th-century American politicians